Ühtri is a village in Hiiumaa Parish, Hiiu County in northwestern Estonia.

Painter Ülo Sooster (1924–1970) was born in Ühtri.

References

 

Villages in Hiiu County